George Washington University Virginia Graduate Campus is the campus of George Washington University in the Ashburn area of unincorporated Loudoun County, Virginia, United States.

Research centers on campus
 Earthquake Engineering and Structures Laboratory
 Energy Research Laboratories
 High Performance Computing Laboratory (HPCL)
 Center for Intelligent Systems Research (CISR)
 National Crash Analysis Center (NCAC)
 Center for Nuclear Studies - Data Analysis Research Center
 Pharmacogenomics/Health Sciences Laboratory
 Center for the Study of Learning (CSL)

Academic programs on campus

There are currently 20 degree and certificate programs being offered on this campus. Programs are available in person, online, or hybrid form.

Business
Information Systems Technology, Executive M.S.
 Information Systems Technology, M.S.
Business Administration, M.B.A.
Project Management, M.S.
 Tourism Administration, M.T.A.
Education
 Educational Administration and Policy Studies, Ed.D.
 Educational Leadership and Administration, M.A., Ed.S., certificate
 Global Leadership in Teams and Organizations, Graduate Certificate
 Human and Organizational Learning, Executive Leadership, Ed.D.
 Leadership Development, Graduate Certificate
Engineering
 Computer Science, M.S.
 Cybersecurity in Computer Science, M.S.
Electrical Engineering, M.S.
 Engineering Management/Systems Engineering, Ph.D.
 Systems Engineering, M.S.
 Telecommunications Engineering, M.S.
 Computer Security and Information Assurance, Graduate Certificate
Health Sciences
 Health Sciences, B.S. (Pharmacogenomics) 
 Translational Health Sciences, Ph.D. (Hybrid) 
Integrated Information, Science, and Technology
 Bachelor's Degree Program in Integrated Information, Science, and Technology
Justice and Public Safety Information Management
 Justice and Public Safety Information Management, Graduate Certificate
Nursing
 Nursing, B.S.N., Second Degree
 Adult, Family, Advanced Family, and Palliative Care Nurse Practitioners, Graduate Certificates (post-masters)
 Health Care Quality for Health Care Providers, Graduate Certificate
 Nursing, D.N.P.
 Nursing, M.S.N. (Adult Practitioner, Clinical Research Administration, Family Nurse Practitioner, Health Care Quality, and Nursing Leadership and Management)

Library
The Virginia Science and Technology Campus Library serves the GW community, including current students, faculty, staff and alumni. Access is also granted to GW affiliated universities, schools and organizations and members of the public using the Foundation Center Collection.

References

External links
 George Washington University Virginia Campus
 Virginia Science and Technology Campus Library

George Washington University
Education in Loudoun County, Virginia